Wymer is an unincorporated community in Lewis County, West Virginia, United States.

References

Unincorporated communities in Lewis County, West Virginia
Unincorporated communities in West Virginia